Frogger 2 is a sequel to the original arcade game. It was released on Xbox Live Arcade for the Xbox 360 on June 11, 2008. This is the third game to be called Frogger 2, the others being Frogger II: ThreeeDeep! and Frogger 2: Swampy's Revenge.

Summary

Frogger 2 features fifteen levels set in five different environments which Frogger attempts to avoid obstacles and enemies and boss battles. The game also contains two multiplayer modes: Race and Jewel Duel. In Race mode, players compete to finish an original Frogger-style level in the fastest time. In Jewel Duel, players compete to claim a jewel.

Reception

Frogger 2 received negative reviews from critics upon release. On Metacritic, the game holds a score of 37/100 based on 12 reviews, indicating "generally unfavorable reviews". On GameRankings, the game holds a score of 34.58% based on 12 reviews.

See also
Frogger II: ThreeeDeep!
Frogger 2: Swampy's Revenge

References

2008 video games
Frogger
Action video games
Video games developed in Japan
Xbox 360-only games
Xbox 360 Live Arcade games
Xbox 360 games
Multiplayer and single-player video games